On 28 July 2021, heavy rains started after the cloudburst in Islamabad, Pakistan, caused flood situation in many parts of the federal capital and killed two people. Several vehicles were swept away in the floods and water entered the basement of houses and plazas in Sector E-11, F-10 and D-12. 116 mm of rain was recorded at the personal weather station in E-11/4 Islamabad.

See also
 Weather of 2021
 2019 Pakistan floods and storms
 2020 Karachi floods
 Climate of Islamabad

References

Disasters in Islamabad
2021 disasters in Pakistan
2021 meteorology
2021 floods in Asia
2021 flooding
Floods in Pakistan
July 2021 events in Pakistan